The Portugal national rugby union team (Portuguese: Seleção Portuguesa de Rugby), nicknamed Os Lobos (The Wolves), represents Portugal in men's international rugby union competitions. The team as well as all rugby union in Portugal is administered by the Federação Portuguesa de Rugby. Portugal qualified for their first Rugby World Cup in 2007 where they were grouped in Pool C along with New Zealand, Italy, Romania and Scotland. They are nicknamed Os Lobos.

Portugal have experienced modest success in the last two decades. They qualified for the 2007 Rugby World Cup in France and though they lost all their matches, they managed to score one try in each game and led against Romania until the late minutes. Portugal qualified for their second Rugby World Cup in 2022, topping a repechage qualifying group featuring the United States, Hong Kong, and Kenya.

History

Early
Portugal played its first ever rugby international in April 1935 against Spain, losing by a single point, 6–5. They played Spain again the following year with Spain winning 16–9. Portugal had more regular competition from the mid-1960s, and won their first game in 1966, defeating Spain 9–3. Portugal played Italy for the first time in 1967, losing 6–3. They also  had their first match against Romania soon after and lost by 40 points. They defeated Belgium in 1968, and also played Morocco for the first time.

The first game of the 1970s was a draw against the Netherlands. Portugal managed to draw with Italy (nil all) in 1972 and following that, defeated them 9–6 in 1973. After a number of mixed results throughout the early 1970s, Portugal won five matches in a row from 1979 through to 1981. They played Morocco, who won the encounter. After a 1983 draw against Spain, Portugal managed a seven-game winning streak from 1984 to 1985, including wins over Belgium, Denmark, Morocco, Czechoslovakia, Poland and Zimbabwe. The first Rugby World Cup was held in 1987, though it was by invitation, thus there was no qualifying tournament and Portugal did not participate.

1990s
From 1989 to 1990, the 1991 World Cup qualifiers were held for the European nations. Portugal started in Round 2b in October 1989. They defeated Czechoslovakia 15 to 13 in Ricant to advance to Round 2c. However here they were defeated by the Netherlands 32–3 and eliminated from qualifying.

Portugal again participated in the 1995 World Cup qualifying competition for European teams, starting in Round 1. They were pooled in the West Group, and defeated Belgium and Switzerland, but lost to Spain, advancing into Round 2. Here Wales defeated them, and they lost to Spain.

Portugal began play in Pool 3 of Round B in the European qualifying competition for the 1999 Rugby World Cup. Portugal won all their group matches except for the one against Spain, but still finished second in the group, which took them into Pool 3 of Round C. All games were held in Edinburgh, Scotland. Portugal lost 85–11 to Scotland, and 21–17 to Spain. Both Scotland and Spain went through to the World Cup; Portugal went into repechage, where Portugal lost a home and away series to Uruguay.

2000s
In 2002 Portugal began playing for a place in the 2003 Rugby World Cup in Pool A of Round 3 of the European qualifying tournament. They were grouped with Spain and Poland. Each nation only won one game, though on for and against Portugal finished second to Spain. Portugal were knocked out of competition. In 2003–04 Portugal won the European Nations Cup, losing only one match to win their first championship. In 2004 Professor Tomaz Morais, coach of the Portugal national team at both sevens and fifteen a side, was nominated for the IRB's coach of the year award. This was a remarkable achievement for a coach from a third tier rugby nation. Morais has been credited with much of Portugal's progress in recent years.

In 2006 it was announced that Portugal would receive a grant from the IRB to help develop their rugby to Tier 2 standard. Few details have been released thus far regarding how the money will be spent but it is hoped it will ensure that Portugal's rugby will be able to move onto the next level. In 2006 the inaugural IRB Nations Cup was hosted in Lisbon. The tournament featured Portugal, Russia, Argentina A and Italy A. It is anticipated that this will become an annual event and another medium through which the Portugal national team can develop their skills.

2007 World Cup

Portugal began their qualification campaign for the 2007 Rugby World Cup in 2004, as part of the European Nations Cup Division 1 2004–06 tournament. They won their first match, defeating Ukraine 6–36. They then defeated Georgia 18–14 in their second match, and then won their third match against the Czech Republic, and defeated Russia as well, but then lost to Romania. Portugal then drew with Russia 19-all, and then lost to Georgia. After a loss to Romania and a win against the Czech Republic, Portugal finished third overall in the standings, and qualified for Round 5.

Round 5 was played in October 2006 as a three match series between Italy, Russia and Portugal. Both Portugal and Russia lost heavily in their matches against Italy, who easily qualified for the finals. Second place came down to the final match of the round in Lisbon. Portugal won the match 26–23 against Russia to make it to Round 6. Round 6 was a home and away series against the Round 5 Pool B winners, Georgia. Portugal lost the first match, but drew 11-all in the second meeting. Georgia went through to the finals, and Portugal entered the repechage round where they defeated Morocco 26–20 on aggregate.

Portugal then faced Uruguay for the last position in the finals. In the first leg of the two-match Repechage series, Portugal won 12–5. In the second game in Montevideo Portugal lost 18–12. On aggregate, Portugal won 24–23, sending them to their first ever World Cup.  Having qualified for their first World Cup, several players were subsequently arrested in the ensuing celebrations as a result of an altercation with local police. No charges were laid and the players involved were allowed to leave Uruguay.

In the 2007 Rugby World Cup, Portugal went to Pool C, alongside favourites the All Blacks, Italy, Romania and Scotland. Portugal's highlights included preventing Italy getting a bonus point, scoring a try against the All Blacks, and coming within a try of beating Romania before losing 14–10. They also managed to score in all the four games, unlike Scotland and Romania. Portugal team were celebrated for their commitment and passion, and for being the only amateur team to make it to the World Cup.

2008–present
After the World Cup, Portugal faced some problems, including the end of the international career or of the career of several key players, like Joaquim Ferreira, Paulo Murinello and Rui Cordeiro, and achieved only one win over Czech Republic in the final round of the European Nations Cup tournament, finishing in 5th place, their worst result since 2002.

On 1 November 2008 they lost at home against Canada 21–13, in a friendly game. Tomás Morais to face the upcoming edition of the Six Nations B, that also qualifies for the 2011 Rugby World Cup finals, had New Zealander Murray Henderson assigned as assistant coach.

Portugal missed the second presence at the Rugby World Cup finals, after two surprising losses at home with Georgia (10–16) and Romania (9–20), which the "Lobos" had previously defeated 22–21 abroad. Portugal thus missed the 3rd place that would have granted access to the Rugby World Cup repechage.

Tomaz Morais was replaced by New Zealand coach Errol Brain, in October 2010, with a three years contract. He had mixed results, starting with strong performances but ended up with disappointing games. He was replaced by Frederico Sousa in October 2013.

Portugal lost to Germany in the 2015–16 European Nations Cup Division 1A, finishing last, resulting in relegation for the following year.

Portugal qualified for the 2023 Rugby World Cup through the repechage tournament in Dubai, beating Hong Kong, Kenya  and drawing with the USA 16-16 on the last game, winning the repechage tournament on point difference.

Record

Rugby Europe International Championships

Notes:
Portugal's last place finish in the 2014–16 European Nations Cup First Division resulted in their relegation to 2016–17 Rugby Europe Trophy in the following year.

World Rugby Nations Cup

World Cup Record

Overall

Below is a table of the representative rugby matches played by a Portugal national XV at test level up until 8 March 2023:

Players

Current squad
Portuguese squad with every player called for the 2023 Rugby Europe Championship.

Head Coach:  Patrice Lagisquet
 Caps Updated: 13 March 2023

Individual all-time records
Gonçalo Uva and Vasco Uva are the most capped players for Portugal (both 101) and Gonçalo Uva also has the record for most matches in the starting XV (95). The highest scorer for Portugal is Gonçalo Malheiro, with 279 points. Malheiro is also the player with the most drop goals (12) and penalty goals (51). Pedro Leal holds the record for most conversions (45). Rodrigo Marta with 27 tries is the player with the most tries scored. Duarte Pinto has the record for most matches as a substitute, with 23 substitutions. Bernardo Duarte holds the record for most matches as a substitute, without ever playing in the starting XV (14).

Coaches

Current coaching staff
The current coaching staff of the Portuguese national team:

Former coaches

Player records

Most caps

Last updated: Portugal vs Spain, 4 March 2023. Statistics include officially capped matches only.

Most tries

Last updated: Portugal vs Spain, 4 March 2023. Statistics include officially capped matches only.

Most points

Last updated: Portugal vs Spain, 4 March 2023. Statistics include officially capped matches only.

Most points in a match

Last updated: Portugal vs Spain, 4 March 2023. Statistics include officially capped matches only.

Most tries in a match

Last updated: Portugal vs Spain, 4 March 2023. Statistics include officially capped matches only.

Most matches as captain

Last updated: Portugal vs Spain, 4 March 2023. Statistics include officially capped matches only.

Notes

References

External links

 Federação Portuguesa de Rugby Official Site 
 World Cup Preview
 Portugal on RugbyData.com

 
European national rugby union teams
Teams in European Nations Cup (rugby union)